Sproston is a civil parish in Cheshire West and Chester, England.  It contains four buildings that are recorded in the National Heritage List for England as designated listed buildings.  Of these, one is listed at Grade II*, the middle of the three grades of listing, and the others are at Grade II, the lowest grade.

Key

Buildings

References

Listed buildings in Cheshire West and Chester
Lists of listed buildings in Cheshire